John Lawrence Goheen (December 10, 1883 – February 3, 1948) was an American missionary, educator and administrator, agriculturist, social worker, and writer who spent most of his career working in India. He made a major contribution to literacy through the Bombay Literacy Campaign of 1939. He established Adult Education Associations in various parts in India with a slogan "Every home a literate home". He promoted religious organizations for literacy conferences.

Early life
He was born on December 10, 1883 in Kolhapur, in India, where his parents were stationed as American Presbyterian missionaries. When he was seven years old, his parents sent him to Wooster, Ohio in the United States for education. He graduated from Wooster Academy in 1902 and from the University of Wooster in 1906.

From 1920 to 1921, he was enrolled in special courses in agriculture at the State Agricultural College in Davis, California. He was director of physical education at Occidental College and Franklin College, and also served as athletic director in a high school in Cleveland, Ohio. 

He married Jane Lea Corbett in 1908. Jane was born in Tacoma, Washington in 1886. She received her early education in Chefoo, China, where her father Hunter Corbett served as an American missionary. She took her college training in the United States, graduating from the College of Wooster in 1907.

Missionary work in India
In 1910 John and Jane Goheen accepted an appointment from the American Presbyterian Missionaries for missionary service in Sangli in western India. The Goheens arrived in India in 1911 and soon after he was placed in charge as the Principal at Sangli Boys School. He transformed the school into an Industrial and Agricultural Educational Institute and instituted an extension service as The Sangli Moveable School. This brought improved agricultural techniques to the villages surrounding Sangli. He was appointed as a member of Bombay Literacy mission. He served a long term as executive secretary of the West India Mission of American Presbyterian Missionaries.

Administrator of Ichalkaranji
Narayanrao Babasaheb Ghorpade, the Ruler of  Ichalkaranji State, which is near Sangli, requested Goheen to administer the Ichalkaranji State while Ghorpade was visiting Europe. Goheen accepted the request and took the position of an administrator of the state in then Bombay Presidency of British India. He worked as administrator of Ichalkaranji state from 1930 to 1934. Soon after taking the charge of the office in Ichalkaranji, he was very much impressed with the administration of the ruler, as well as the spirit and enterprise which pervaded in Ichalkaranji State, a territory of about 80 villages and Ichalkaranji town. He wrote a book about Ichalkaranji State called Glimpses of Ichalkaranji.

Allahabad Agricultural Institute
In 1944, Goheen was elected as a principal of Allahabad Agricultural Institute, one of the oldest agricultural institutes in India located in Allahabad in north India.

Jane Goheen
His wife Jane Goheen worked as a teacher in academic and Bible classes in Sangli School. After Mr. Goheen's appointment to the Allahabad Agricultural Institute, Jane Goheen taught in the school of home economics, where Christian girls were trained to teach the women of India better ways of living and caring for their families. During her last few years of service, she worked with the women of Kolhapur and surrounding villages, organizing them more effectively for the work of the church. She retired in 1952 and died in 1977.

Death
In September 1947 Goheen went to New York for specialized medical treatment. He died on February 3, 1948 at the age of 64. His collection of manuscripts, photographs, and correspondence is kept at the Presbyterian Historical Society in Philadelphia.

Recognition
In 1937 the College of Wooster presented John Lawrence Goheen with an honorary Doctor of Law degree for outstanding accomplishment in the mission field.

Books
Glimpses of Ichalkaranji
Keeping Milk Goats in India (1933)

Archival Collection
The Presbyterian Historical Society in Philadelphia, Pennsylvania, has a collection of John Goheen's incoming and outgoing Correspondence from 1910 to 1947.

See also
Mahatma Gandhi, letters to Americans Page 144 – Bharatiya Vidya Bhavan, 1998 Intellect: Volume 67
Collected works ( Letter to J L Goheen on Page 369), Author Mohandas Karamchand Gandhi . Publisher- Publications Division, Ministry of Information and Broadcasting, Govt. of India, 1984
India Shall Be Literate, By Frank C. Laubach 1940

References

External links
 

1883 births
1948 deaths
People from Kolhapur
American Presbyterian missionaries
Presbyterian missionaries in India
Franklin Grizzlies football coaches
Occidental Tigers football coaches
College of Wooster alumni
American expatriates in India